Sandra Collins Part 2 is a mix created by DJ Sandra Collins. It was released in 2006 under the Perfecto Label, which is owned by Paul Oakenfold.

Track listing
Disc One

"She's Hardcore (TV Rock Mix)" - Gary Gecko & Pigwboy
"Deep Throat (Original Mix)" - Andrea Doria
"The Tip (Tom Neville Remix)" - King Roc
"We Share Our Mothers Health (Trentemøller Mix)" - The Knife
"Love & Its Consequences (Original Mix)" - AAV
"Urban Minds" - Pacjam
"It Comes From Inside (Trent Cantrelle Mix)" - Low End Specialists
"Starwaves (Spirit Catcher's Time Modulator Mix)" - Esoterik
"I Feel Space (Tomba Special Space)" - Lindstrom
"Our Future Legacy (Canuckistani Bombs Mix)" - BP Zulauf & Dean Dixon

Disc Two

"Silent Violence (Original Mix)" - C79
"Je T'Aime (JEE Remix)" - Rocco Mundo & ONNO
"Past Will Be Future" - Flash Brothers
"Dogma (DJ Tarkan Remix)" - Siberian Son
"Closer (With Molly Bancroft)" - Gabriel & Dresden
"Sigh (Salinas Dub Mix)" - Carl Fath
"Munich (Cicada Remix)" - Editors
"Let Go (With Molly Bancroft, Original Mix)" - Gabriel & Dresden
"Not Alone Tonight Feat. Kenra Foster (Blake Jerrell Club Mix)" - Marscruiser
"Hammer & Tongs (Blake Jerrell Remix)" - Envotion
"Down In Me (Cicada Remix)" - Silencer

Personnel
Sandra Collins - Mixing

Techno albums by American artists
Sandra Collins albums
2006 remix albums